Eduvie Ikoba (born October 26, 1997) is an American professional soccer player who plays as a forward for Hungarian club Zalaegerszeg.

Career

Early career
Ikoba played four years of college soccer at Dartmouth College between 2015 and 2018, where he scored 17 goals and tallied 8 assists in 62 appearances.

While at college, Ikoba also appeared for USL PDL side Black Rock FC in 2018, where he made a single appearance.

Professional
On January 14, 2019, Ikoba was selected 63rd overall in the 2019 MLS SuperDraft by FC Dallas. However, he was released by the club without earning a contract.

In July 2019, Ikoba signed for Hungarian NB I side ZTE.

On July 13, 2020, Ikoba moved to Fortuna Liga side AS Trenčín on a three-year deal.

Career statistics

References

External links
 
 

1997 births
Living people
People from Bettendorf, Iowa
American sportspeople of Nigerian descent
Soccer players from Iowa
American soccer players
African-American soccer players
Association football forwards
FC Dallas draft picks
Dartmouth Big Green men's soccer players
Zalaegerszegi TE players
AS Trenčín players
USL League Two players
Nemzeti Bajnokság I players
Slovak Super Liga players
American expatriate soccer players
Expatriate footballers in Hungary
American expatriate sportspeople in Hungary
Expatriate footballers in Slovakia
American expatriate sportspeople in Slovakia
21st-century African-American sportspeople